The 1st Vietnamese Parachute Battalion (Fr: 1er bataillon de parachutistes vietnamiens) was a French-Vietnamese paratroop battalion formed in Saigon, French Indochina in 1951.

Operational history 
The 1st Vietnamese Parachute Battalion (5 BPVN) was one of five battalions of Vietnamese paratroopers raised by the French Army between 1951 and 1957 as part of General Jean de Lattre de Tassigny's policy to establish a Vietnamese Army. Its cadre was drawn from volunteers from 1st Guards Company and from 1st Colonial Commando Parachute Battalion (1 BCCP).

See also 

 3rd Vietnamese Parachute Battalion
 5th Vietnamese Parachute Battalion
 6th Vietnamese Parachute Battalion
 7th Vietnamese Parachute Battalion
 1st Cambodian Parachute Regiment
 1st Laotian Parachute Battalion

Parachute infantry battalions of France
Military units and formations of the First Indochina War
Vietnam
Vietnamese Parachute Battalion
Vietnamese Parachute Battalion
Vietnamese Parachute Battalion
Vietnamese Parachute Regiment
Vietnamese Parachute Battalion